CNX (short for Cartoon Network Extreme) was a short-lived British television channel operated by Turner Broadcasting System Europe in the UK and Ireland. It was aimed at a male audience, with daytime programming aimed at older children and teenagers (predominantly 12–18 years of age), and evening programming aimed at older teenagers and young adults (the 17-34 demographic). The channel was carried in the 'Entertainment' section of the Sky programme guide and was also available on cable. Although CNX was said to stand for Cartoon Network Extreme by some viewers, the channel was advertised with a promo featuring the character Brak from The Brak Show singing "C is for comedy, N is for Japanese animation, X is for extreme", as well as a promo showing Aku from Samurai Jack morphing into silhouettes of characters of shows from the channel.

History
On 24 September 2002, Turner Broadcasting System Europe announced the launch of CNX on 14 October.

At the beginning of 2003, the channel introduced a Toonami programming strand that would air during the daytime hours. On 9 July 2003, Turner announced that CNX would close and rebrand as a standalone Toonami channel beginning in September 2003, with a Turner spokesperson citing that the adult market being "crowded and competitive" as the reason for its closure. On September 1, it was officially revealed that CNX would rebrand as Toonami on September 9, and on that day, CNX closed for the final time at 1am and its slot on Sky Digital and NTL was moved to the "Kids" sections and relabelled as Toonami, which launched at 6am on that day.

Programming
The channel's programming was divided between an adult-aimed output in the evenings and younger-skewing programming under the Toonami block, which was moved to the channel in May 2003 after a few months of the former Toonami shows being shown under the CNX identity. The station primarily aired anime, extreme sports, and dramas (principally action/crime series such as The Shield and Birds of Prey). The channel's film telecasts predominantly consisted of martial arts films, anime films and action/drama.

See also
Cartoon Network (British and Irish TV channel)
Toonami (British and Irish TV channel)

References

Defunct television channels in the United Kingdom
Television channels and stations established in 2002
Television channels and stations disestablished in 2003
Anime television
Cartoon Network
Toonami
Warner Bros. Discovery EMEA